The 2022 Bulgarian Supercup was the 19th edition of the Bulgarian Supercup, an annual football match played between the winners of the previous season's First League and the Bulgarian Cup. The game was played between the champions of the 2021–22 First League, Ludogorets Razgrad, and the 2021–22 Bulgarian Cup winners, Levski Sofia.

This was Ludogorets's 10th Supercup appearance and Levski Sofia's 5th. It was also the two teams' first meeting in the Supercup.

Initially supposed to be played on 2 July 2022, the game was rescheduled for a date between 30 August and 1 September 2022. On 12 August 2022, it has been announced that the game has been scheduled for 1 September 2022.

The match finished 2–2, but Ludogorets won 4–3 on penalties for their 6th Supercup title.

Match details

References

2022
Supercup
Supercup 2022
Supercup 2022